Goniorhynchus pasithea is a moth in the family Crambidae. It was described by James Farish Malcolm Fawcett in 1916. It is found in eastern Africa.

References

Moths described in 1916
Spilomelinae